"Amber Cascades" is a song written by Dewey Bunnell and performed by America.  It reached number 17 on both the U.S. and the Canadian adult contemporary charts, number 75 on the Billboard Hot 100, and number 82 on the Canadian pop chart in 1976.  It was featured on their 1976 album, Hideaway.

The song was produced and arranged by George Martin.

Charts

References

1976 songs
1976 singles
Songs written by Dewey Bunnell
America (band) songs
Song recordings produced by George Martin
Warner Records singles